Hamir may refer to:

 Hamir, a pigeon in the 2006 Disney animated film The Wild
 Hameer, a Hindustani classical raga also spelt Hamir
 Hameer (film), a 2017 Gujarati film
 Hammiradeva, also known as Hamir Dev, 13th-century Chahamana king of Ranthambore, India
 Hammir Singh, 14th-century ruler of the state of Mewar in India
 Hamir Singh II, maharana of Mewar from 1772–1778
Rana Hamir Singh, 26th rana of Umerkot
Bir Hambir, 49th king of Mallabhum
Hambirrao Mohite, military commander of the Maratha Empire
Hameersingh Bhayal, Indian politician

See also
 Hammira (disambiguation)
 Hamirpur (disambiguation)